Lucas Sebastián Torreira Di Pascua (born 11 February 1996) is a Uruguayan professional footballer who plays as a defensive or central midfielder for Süper Lig club Galatasaray and the Uruguay national team.

Club career

Early career
Torreira started his youth football career at hometown club I.A. 18 de Julio of Fray Bentos. In 2013, at age 16, he joined Montevideo Wanderers' youth team, before moving to Italy where he joined Pescara's youth team in January 2015.

Pescara
Before the 2014–15 season, Torreira was called up for Pescara's first team and, on 25 October 2014, he sat on the bench for the first time. He made his senior debut in Serie B on 16 May 2015 against Varese, playing the game as a starter. He played 58 minutes before being replaced by Matteo Politano.

Sampdoria
On 1 July 2015, Torreira was transferred to Sampdoria for €1.5 million, but he remained with Pescara on loan for the 2015–16 season to gain first-team experience. On 2 July, his loan to Pescara became official. On 9 August 2015, Torreira scored his first professional goal against F.C. Südtirol in the 2015–16 Coppa Italia.

After the Pescara loan ended, Torreira returned to Sampdoria on 1 July 2016. On 21 August 2016, Torreira made his Serie A debut in their opening game against Empoli at the Stadio Carlo Castellani. He started the game and played the entire match.

He became a regular for Sampdoria in the 2016–17 season, and continued showing his importance to the team in the 2017–18 season; scoring vital goals, including the second goal in Sampdoria's 3–2 win over Juventus in November.

Arsenal
On 10 July 2018, Torreira joined English club Arsenal for an undisclosed fee, believed to be around £26 million. Torreira was given the number 11 shirt, previously worn by Mesut Özil, who took the vacant number 10 following the departure of Jack Wilshere.

2018–19: Debut season, European runner-up
Torreira made his Premier League debut on 12 August, coming on as a substitute on the 70th minute in a 2–0 defeat to Manchester City. Torreira registered his first assist of the season, by setting up Alexandre Lacazette's winning goal in a 3–2 win over Cardiff City. Torreira made his full-debut and his Europa League debut for Arsenal in the 4–2 win over FC Vorskla Poltava on 2 September, before being replaced in the 57th minute by Matteo Guendouzi. Torreira's performance in Arsenal's 1–1 draw with Liverpool drew particularly high praise from fans and pundits alike, picking up the man-of-the-match award. On 2 December, Torreira scored his first Arsenal goal and picked up another man-of-the-match award against Tottenham Hotspur when he latched on to a pass from Pierre-Emerick Aubameyang to slot the ball past Hugo Lloris to give Arsenal a fourth goal in a 4–2 North London derby victory. A week later, on 8 December, Torreira scored a late 83rd-minute winner against Huddersfield Town with a bicycle kick, giving him his second goal in as many games at the Emirates Stadium. In the match, Torreira was also awarded his fifth consecutive Arsenal Man of the Match performance. Torreira was dismissed in stoppage time during the club's reverse fixture against Tottenham at Wembley after a late challenge on Danny Rose. The match ended 1–1 and it was Torreira's first red card for Arsenal; although Arsenal attempted to appeal the ban, their appeal was rejected by the FA, which meant that Torreira's ban would still result in a three-match ban. As a result, Torreira would miss Arsenal's games against Manchester United, Newcastle United and Everton. ESPN's Bill Barnwell named Torreira the third best signing of the Premier League season.

2019–20: FA Cup win
Torreira made his first appearance of the season in Arsenal's 2–1 win over Burnley on 17 August. Torreira scored his first goal of the season in Arsenal's 3–1 defeat to Liverpool after replacing Dani Ceballos in the 61st minute. He struggled for playing time early on in the season, but regained a starting position under new Arsenal manager Mikel Arteta. On 2 March, Torreira suffered a presumably season-ending ankle injury in an FA Cup win against Portsmouth. However, the Premier League suspension due to the COVID-19 pandemic gave Torreira enough time to heal and return to fitness by the time the season restarted in June. He played only sparingly for the rest of the season.

2020–21: Loan to Atlético Madrid
On 5 October 2020, Torreira joined Atlético Madrid on a season-long loan. On 17 October, Torreira made his debut in a 2–0 win against Celta Vigo in the La Liga. On 31 October, he came off the bench and scored his first goal for the club in a 3–1 league win over Osasuna.

2021–22: Loan to Fiorentina
On 25 August 2021, Fiorentina announced the signing of Torreira on loan from Arsenal until 30 June 2022 with an option to buy him next summer for around £13m. On 12 September, Torreira made his debut in Fiorentina's 2–1 win over Atalanta, after being named in Italiano's starting eleven.

Galatasaray
On 8 August 2022, Torriera signed for Süper Lig club Galatasaray on a four-year contract, for a reported fee of €6 million.

International career 

Torreira was born in Uruguay, and is of Spanish descent through his paternal grandfather from Galicia. He holds a Spanish passport, and was scouted by the senior Italy national football team before he was capped by Uruguay.

Torreira was called up to the senior Uruguay squad for the 2018 China Cup in March 2018. He made his debut in the 2–0 win over the Czech Republic in the China Cup semi-final on 23 March.

In June 2018, he was named in Uruguay's final 23-man squad for the 2018 FIFA World Cup in Russia. The tournament served as a breakthrough for Torreira, who played in all five of Uruguay's games.

Style of play
Upon signing for Arsenal in 2018, The Independents Jack Austin stated "Torreira is exactly the kind of no-nonsense midfielder the club have been craving", adding that in Uruguay colours during the 2018 World Cup "he went about his job as the deep-lying pivot in the middle of the park with none of the fuss and all of the discipline of a player who has built a tidy reputation for himself in Serie A", while assessing his chief weaknesses as a lack of height in aerial duels and little goal threat.

WhoScored notes that Torreira is a player who likes to shoot from distance and often gets fouled. They also note that he likes to play short passes and make tackles.

Atlético Madrid manager, Diego Simeone, praised Torreira for his high work rate and speed on the pitch.

Career statistics
Club

International

HonoursArsenalFA Cup: 2019–20
UEFA Europa League runner-up: 2018–19Atletico Madrid'
La Liga: 2020–21

References

1996 births
Living people
People from Fray Bentos
Uruguayan footballers
Uruguay international footballers
Serie B players
Serie A players
Premier League players
La Liga players
Süper Lig players
Delfino Pescara 1936 players
U.C. Sampdoria players
Arsenal F.C. players
Atlético Madrid footballers
ACF Fiorentina players
Galatasaray S.K. footballers
Association football midfielders
2018 FIFA World Cup players
2019 Copa América players
2022 FIFA World Cup players
Uruguayan expatriate footballers
Expatriate footballers in Italy
Uruguayan expatriate sportspeople in Italy
Expatriate footballers in England
Uruguayan expatriate sportspeople in England
Uruguayan people of Spanish descent
Expatriate footballers in Spain
Uruguayan expatriate sportspeople in Spain
Expatriate footballers in Turkey
Uruguayan expatriate sportspeople in Turkey